The Indian 10 coin is a former denomination of the Indian rupee. The 10 Paise coin equals  of a rupee. The last issue, minted in stainless steel, was first introduced into circulation in 1988.

References

Historical currencies of India
Coins of India